Herbert Page Barringer (1886 – 12 August 1946) was an Australian watercolour artist.

Biography 

Barringer was born in North Adelaide on 22 November 1886, the child of Leonard Barringer and his wife Fanny ( Page). His older sister, Ethel Barringer, was another painter. He married Gwendoline L'Avence Adamson, also a watercolourist, in North Adelaide on 18 Nov 1910. They divorced in 1937.

Barringer painted Australian landscapes and was active in the 1920s and 1930s.

He died in South Australia on 12 August 1946 and a memorial exhibition of his work was held in Adelaide later that year.

Gallery

References 

1886 births
1946 deaths
20th-century Australian painters
20th-century Australian male artists
Australian watercolourists
Australian male painters
Artists from Adelaide